The Museum of Old and New Art (MONA) is an art museum located within the Moorilla winery on the Berriedale peninsula in Hobart, Tasmania, Australia. It is the largest privately funded museum in the Southern Hemisphere. MONA houses ancient, modern and contemporary art from the David Walsh collection. Noted for its central themes of sex and death, the museum has been described by Walsh as a "subversive adult Disneyland".

MONA was officially opened on 21 January 2011. Along with its frequently updated indoor collection, Mona also hosts the annual Mona Foma and Dark Mofo music and arts festivals which showcase large-scale public art and live performances.

History
The precursor to MONA, the Moorilla Museum of Antiquities, was founded in 2001 by Tasmanian millionaire David Walsh. It closed on 20 May 2006 to undergo $75 million renovations.

The new museum was officially opened on 21 January 2011, coinciding with the third MOFO festival. The afternoon opening party was attended by 1,350 invited guests. 2,500 members of the public were selected by random ballot for the evening event which included performances by The DC3, True Live, The Scientists of Modern Music, Wire, Health and The Cruel Sea.

Architecture
The single-storey MONA building appears at street level to be dominated by its surroundings, but its interior possesses a spiral staircase that leads down to three larger levels of labyrinthine display spaces built into the side of the cliffs around Berriedale peninsula. The decision to build it largely underground was taken, according to Walsh, to preserve the heritage setting of the two Roy Grounds houses on the property. Walsh has also said that he wanted a building that "could sneak up on visitors rather than broadcast its presence ... 'a sense of danger' that would enliven the experience of viewing art". Most visitors approach by ferry up the River Derwent.

There are no windows and the atmosphere is intentionally ominous. On entering the museum, visitors descend a "seemingly endless flight of stairs", an experience one critic compared with "going down into Petra". To see the art, the visitor must work back upwards towards the surface, a trajectory that has been contrasted with the descending spiral that many visitors follow in New York's Guggenheim Museum.

Katsalidis's architecture for the museum has been praised as not only fulfilling its function as a showcase for a collection, but also succeeding as it "extends and magnifies into an experience ... there is a sense that the work, the lighting, the space and the materiality have been choreographed with subtlety and skill into a singular if hugely idiosyncratic whole."

Expenses
Operational costs of A$8 million per annum are underpinned by the winery, brewery, restaurant and hotel on the same site. In May 2011, it was announced that the museum would end its policy of free entry and introduce an entry fee to interstate and overseas visitors while remaining free for Tasmanians.

MONA also offers an unusual membership program called "Eternity Membership", which not only includes lifetime free admission but notably earns members the right to be cremated and their remains housed in the MONA Cemetery.

Collection

The museum houses over 1,900 artistic works from David Walsh's private collection. Notable works in its inaugural exhibition, Monanism, included Australia's largest modernist artwork, Sidney Nolan's Snake mural, displayed publicly for the first time in Australia; Wim Delvoye's Cloaca Professional, a machine which replicates the human digestive system and turns food into faeces, excreting it daily; Stephen Shanabrook's On the road to heaven the highway to hell, remains of a suicide bomber cast in dark chocolate; and Chris Ofili's The Holy Virgin Mary, a painting created partially with elephant dung. The collection was valued in 2011 at more than $100 million.

The curators of MONA are Nicole Durling for Australian contemporary art and Olivier Varenne for international modern and contemporary art.

The artworks on display are in non-chronological order and without museum labels. Instead, visitors are given the option of using free headphones and an iPod-like device called the 'O', which has an in-built GPS that senses where its holder is located and displays information about artworks nearby. Users of the O can select different interpretations of any given piece: 'Summary' (a brief description of the work and its artist); 'Art Wank' (curator's notes); 'Gonzo' (Walsh's personal opinions and stories), 'Ideas' (quotes and talking points); and 'Media' (oftentimes interviews with artists). Walsh also commissioned Damian Cowell, frontman of satirical Melbourne band TISM, to write and record songs about certain works for the O device. They were released as a free album, Vs Art, with MONA's 2010 book Monanisms.

Reception
Michael Connor of the conservative literary and cultural magazine Quadrant said that "MONA is the art of the exhausted, of a decaying civilisation. Display lights and taste and stunning effects illuminate moral bankruptcy. What is highlighted melds perfectly with contemporary high fashion, design, architecture, cinema. It is expensive and tense decay."

Richard Dorment, art critic for the UK newspaper The Daily Telegraph, said that Walsh "doesn't collect famous names; his indifference to fashion is one of the strengths of the collection. He likes art that is fun and grabs your attention, that packs a sting in the tail or a punch in the solar plexus."

Music and arts festivals

Mona hosts the annual outdoor Mona Foma music festival in summer, and its wintertime counterpart, Dark Mofo, with extensive public art exhibitions amid a fairground setting of food and drink, live music and entertainment. Past headliners at Mona Foma include Nick Cave and the Bad Seeds, John Cale, Godspeed You! Black Emperor, Swans, PJ Harvey and David Byrne, while Dark Mofo line-ups have featured musical acts such as Einstürzende Neubauten, Sunn O))), Laurie Anderson, Mogwai, Ulver, Autechre and Merzbow.

Tourism
In 2012, Lonely Planet ranked Hobart as one of the ten must-visit cities in 2013, citing MONA as a major tourist attraction in a small city, similar to the Guggenheim Museum in Bilbao.

Ferries

Gallery

See also
List of museums in Tasmania

References

Further reading

External links

Official website
Extract from The Making of MONA, by Adrian Franklin, Penguin Books Australia
LUX-Mag.com, Art on the Far Side
Podcast - Sex and Death Are on Display at the Museum of Old and New Art

Ferry companies of Tasmania
Modern art museums
Museum of Old and New Art
Art museums established in 2011
Museum of Old and New Art
Museums in Hobart
Art museums and galleries in Tasmania
Museum of Old and New Art